The Kuwaiti Federation Cup is a competition organised by the Kuwait Football Association, the Kuwaiti version of a League cup and has been played in its current format every year since 2008.

The first edition of the Federation Cup however was played in the 1969–70 season, although not much is known about the competition in the early years. The competition is for senior teams playing in the top tier Kuwaiti Premier League, although the 2015–16 edition saw Burgan enter to gain much needed practice before they enter the top flight.

The cup competition is predominantly played during international breaks  (group stage) and after league match days. the Tournament was abolished at the end of 2015–16 season later returned in 2017–18.

Previous winners
 1969–70 : Al-Arabi SC
 1970–73 : Cancelled
 1973–74 : Al-Fahaheel
 1974–75 : Khaitan SC
 1975–77 : Cancelled
 1977–78 : Kuwait SC
 1978–79 : Al-Arabi SC
 1979–90 : Cancelled 
 1991–92 : Kuwait SC
 1995–96 : Al-Arabi SC
 1996–97 : Al-Arabi SC
 1997–98 : Cancelled
 1998–99 : Al-Arabi SC
 1999–2000 : Al-Arabi SC
 2000–01 : Al-Arabi SC
 2001–02 : Cancelled
 2002–03 : Al-Yarmouk SC
 2003–07 : Cancelled

Return of tournament

Performance By Club

External links
 goalzz.com – Kuwaiti Federation Cup
 Kuwait - List of Cup Winners – RSSSF
 Kuwait Federation Cup – Hailoosport.com (Arabic)
 Kuwait Federation Cup – Hailoosport.com

 
Kuwaiti football friendly trophies
Recurring sporting events established in 2008
2008 establishments in Kuwait